Robert Marawa (born March 1, 1973) is a sports journalist, radio and television presenter.

Education
He attended Hilton College near Pietermaritzburg and the University of the Witwatersrand where he studied law, but later dropped out in 1992.

He worked as a presenter for SuperSport and is the former host of 083 Sports@6 on Metro FM.

References

External links
Profile at tvsa.co.za

1973 births
Living people
People from Vryheid
Zulu people
South African sports journalists
South African radio presenters
South African television presenters
University of the Witwatersrand alumni
Alumni of Hilton College (South Africa)